Robbie Groff (born January 31, 1966 in Mission Hills, California), is a former driver in the Indy Racing League and CART Championship Car series and is brother of Mike Groff.  He raced in the 1994 CART season and 1997-1998 IRL seasons with 9 combined starts.  His best career finish was in his first race, a ninth place at the 1997 Indianapolis 500.

Motorsports Career Results

American Open-Wheel racing results
(key) (Races in bold indicate pole position)

American Racing Series / Indy Lights

CART Indy Car World Series

Indy Racing League

External links
Driver DB Profile

1966 births
Champ Car drivers
Indianapolis 500 drivers
Indy Lights drivers
SCCA Formula Super Vee drivers
IndyCar Series drivers
24 Hours of Daytona drivers
Living people
People from Mission Hills, Santa Barbara County, California
Racing drivers from California

Bettenhausen Racing drivers